Knut Husebø (born 10 May 1946) is a Norwegian actor and visual artist.

Born in Stavanger, Husebø debuted in 1968 in the role Flyndrefanten in the play Taremare by on Den Nationale Scene. He was employed at the Nationaltheatret 1969–1971 and 1975–1986, interrupted by an engagement at the National Theatre 1977–1979 and 1982–1983. Since 1986 he has been a freelance actor.

Among the roles Husebø has played are Edmund in King Lear, Orsino in the Twelfth Night and the title role in Henrik Ibsen's Catiline. He played the multifaceted  Benoni in Fjernsynsteatret's adaptation of Knut Hamsun's novels Benoni and Rosa, and he had one of the leading parts in  Per Bronken's television series adaptation of Sigrid Undset's  Jenny.

In more recent years Husebø's work has most prominently been as a visual artist.

Select filmography
 Cold Lunch (2008)
 Max Manus (2008)
 Morgan Kane: Døden er en ensom jeger (2001)
 Lapin kullan kimallus (1999)
 Trollsyn (1994)
 Bryllupsfesten (1989)
 Apprentice to Murder (1988)
 Adjø Solidaritet (1984)
 Ingenjör Andrées luftfärd (1982)
 Julia Julia (1981)
 Life and Death (1980)
 Oss (1976)
 Knut Formos siste jakt (1973)

Television
 Benoni og Rosa (1973)

Select theater

Nationaltheatret
 Faderen (1968)
 Dyrene i Hakkebakkeskogen (1969)
 Det store smellet (1969)

Riksteatret
 Hedda Gabler (1995)

Centralteateret
 Rocky Horror Show (1977)
 Fantomets glade bryllup (1978)

Hålogaland Teater
 The Threepenny Opera (1971)

References

External links
 

Living people
1946 births
Norwegian male stage actors
Norwegian male film actors
Norwegian male television actors
20th-century Norwegian painters
Norwegian male painters
21st-century Norwegian painters
Actors from Stavanger
20th-century Norwegian male artists
21st-century Norwegian male artists